These are the results of the women's artistic team all-around competition, one of six events for female competitors in artistic gymnastics at the 1992 Summer Olympics in Barcelona.  The compulsory and optional rounds took place on July 26 and 28 at the Palau d'Esports de Barcelona.

Qualification
The top 12 teams at the 1991 World Artistic Gymnastics Championships earned places in the team all-around competition.

Results
 
Tatiana Gutsu did not officially qualify for the individual all-around, and Rozalia Galiyeva did. However, coaches pulled Galiyeva out due to a fake knee injury and replaced her with Gutsu, who later won the all-around.

External links
Official Olympic Report
www.gymnasticsresults.com

Women's team all-around
1992 in women's gymnastics
Women's events at the 1992 Summer Olympics